Pâncota (Hungarian: Pankota) is a town in Arad County, Crișana, Romania. The town is situated at a  distance from the county seat, Arad, in the central zone of the county, at the contact zone of the Arad Plateau and Zărand Mountains. The town administers one village, Măderat (Magyarád).

The first mention in documents of the locality dates back to 1202-1203,  when it was known as villa Pankota.

History

 
The centre of the town was ravaged by invaders several times. The Ottoman Turks captured the town repeatedly. In 1687 it passed under the administration of the Habsburg empire, as confirmed by the Treaty of Karlowitz in 1699.

Until 1918, Pâncota was part of the Austrian monarchy, province of Hungary; in Transleithania after the compromise of 1867 in the  Kingdom of Hungary.

The post-office was opened in 1855. The Treaty of Trianon of 1920  attributed the Arad region to Romania (the Great Romanian Union).

Economy
The town's present-day economy can be characterized by a powerful dynamic force with significant developments in all the sectors. Industry of building materials, furniture industry, light industry, food industry, services and tourism are the most representative economic sectors. Pâncota is an important centre of wine growing, in the Măderat region, with the vineyards Pâncota, Silindia, and Mocrea.

Tourist attractions
Among the most significant touristic sights of the town are the urban environs along Tudor Vladimirescu Street, the old post office, the "Sulkowski" palace, the  — an important hydrotechnical work and the Green House (Casa verde) situated on the main Boulevard.

Demographics

According to the 2011 census its population counts 6,651 inhabitants. From an ethnical point of view it has the following structure:
78.54% are Romanians, 10.91% Roma, 6.63% Hungarians, 2.13% Germans, 0.25% Slovaks, 0.91% Ukrainians, and 0.1% are of other or undeclared nationalities

Natives
 Ilie Moț (1946–1982/83), footballer

References

Populated places in Arad County
Towns in Romania
Localities in Crișana